Salvia argentea, the silver sage, silver salvia, or silver clary, is a biennial or short-lived perennial plant that is native to an area in southern Europe from Portugal to Bulgaria. Its Latin specific epithet argentea means "silvery", referring to the colour of the leaves.

Description
Both leaf surfaces are heavily covered with silky hairs that give it a wooly appearance. The leaves are soft to the touch, first emerging as a distinctive silvery white and then turning to grey-green after flowering. Cool weather in the autumn turns the leaves silvery again.

Flowers appear in spring or summer on  candelabra-like stalks that rise well above the foliage. The inconspicuous white flowers are tinged with yellow or pink. Cutting the flowers before they set seed results in a long-lived plant.

Salvia argentea has received the Royal Horticultural Society's Award of Garden Merit. It requires a south-facing position in full sun. Although hardy down to  it dislikes the combination of winter wet and freezing temperatures. It may therefore be short-lived.

References

External links
USDA Plants Profile

argentea
Flora of Africa